BBC Domesday Reloaded was a local history web site for the digitised content of the BBC's 1986 Domesday Project. It was launched in May 2011 and included some updates contributed by users during 2011. During the site's first day of public operation, over two million pages were viewed.

History

The BBC said that it worked with The National Archives to transfer the material. The data was extracted to a PC compatible computer by communication with a BBC Master computer which could read the disks from the original system. The transfer was facilitated by Simon Guerrero and Andy Finney, who were involved in the original project (Andy as an engineer and Simon as a teenage contributor).

In December 2011, the BBC announced installations of large horizontally installed (table-style) touchscreen interfaces to the data, known as "TouchTable". They are housed at its MediaCityUK site in Salford and The National Museum of Computing in Bletchley. The TouchTables used have a diagonal display size of 52 inches, which exceeded the largest LCD-based  screen available at the time.

The website was transferred to The National Archives in June 2018.

Main features

The website provided online access to images and articles from the original Domesday Project. Visitors were able to update information from their local area until the end of October 2011. Some local libraries hosted events for residents to contribute updates to the site.

References

External links
  Archived, non-functioning (July 2018)
 The National Archives Series reference PRO 30/100: Data from BBC Domesday Project

History websites of the United Kingdom
British online encyclopedias
Domesday Book
Domesday Reloaded
2011 establishments in the United Kingdom
Internet properties established in 2011